Johann Nepomuk von Laicharting was an Austrian entomologist. He was born in Innsbruck on 4 February 1754 and died in the same city on 7 May 1797, and was a Professor of Natural Science (Naturgeschichte) in Innsbruck. He described new species and genera of Coleoptera in Verzeichniss und Beschreibung der Tyroler-Insecten. 1. Teil. Kaferartige Insecten. 1. Band. 1781: I-XII, 1-248. - Zurich, bey Johann Casper Fuessly 1781. In English, lists and descriptions of Tyrol insects - beetles. Presumably this was intended to cover all Austrian insects but no further parts were published.

Sources
Gaedicke in Groll, E. K. (Hrsg.): Biografien der Entomologen der Welt : Datenbank. Version 4.15 : Senckenberg Deutsches Entomologisches Institut, 2010.
 Index Novus Litteraturae Entomologicae Completely revised new edition of the Index Litteraturae Entomologicae Bibliography of the literature on entomology from the beginning until 1863

1754 births
1797 deaths
Scientists from Innsbruck
Austrian entomologists